
This is a list of aircraft in alphabetical order beginning with 'S'.

Se

SEA 
(Société d'Etudes Aéronautiques (Belgium))
 SEA.1

SEA 
(Société d'Etudes Aéronautiques (France))
 SEA I
 SEA II
 SEA III
 SEA IV
 SEA VI

Sea and Sky
(Sea and Sky Inc, Fort Walton Beach, Florida, United States)
Sea and Sky Cygnet
Sea and Sky Explorer 103

Sea-Bow International
(Valcourt, Quebec, Canada)
Sea-Bow International Sea-Bow

Seair 
(Seair Technologies)
 Seair Flying Boat

Seabird 
(Seabird Aviation Australia Pty. Ltd. Australia)
 Seabird SB-4 Sentinel
 Seabird SB5 Sentinel
 Seabird SB7 Seeker

Seabird 
(Seabird Aviation Inc, Columbus, Ohio, United States)
 Seabird Le Petrel

Seaflight (NZ) 
(Shearwater Aircraft)
 Shearwater 201

Seagrave 
(Marshal T Seagrave, Piedmont (Oakland), California, United States)
 Seasgrave 1

Seahawk 
(Seahawk Industries)
 Seahawk Condor
 Seahawk Condor II
 Seahawk Condor III

Searey 
(Progressive Aerodyne Inc (fdr: Kerry Richter), Orlando, Florida, United States)
 Progressive Aerodyne SeaRey

SeaStar Aircraft 
 SeaStar Aircraft SeaStar

Seawind 
(Seawind International / SNA Inc.)
 Seawind
 Seawind 2000
 Seawind 3000
 Seawind 300C

Seabring 
(Robert M Sebring, San Fernando, California, United States)
 Sebring 1948 Monoplane

SECAN
(Société d'Etudes et de Construction Aéro-Navales, France)
 SECAN Courlis

SECAT
(Société d'Etudes et de Construction d'Avions de Tourisme, France)
 SECAT RG-60
 SECAT RG-75
 SECAT S-4 Mouette 
 SECAT S-5
 SECAT VI La Mouette

SECM-Amiot 
(SECM-Amiot - Société d'Emboutissage et de Constructions Mécaniques  /  Félix Amiot)
See:- Avions Amiot

Security-National 
(Security Aircraft Corp, Long Beach, California, United States)
 Security-National S-1 Airster
 Security-National S-1-A Airster
 Security-American S-1-B Airster

Seedwings Europe
(Schlitters, Austria)
Seedwings Europe Crossover XC
Seedwings Europe Crossover XCs
Seedwings Europe Funky
Seedwings Europe Kestrel
Seedwings Europe Merlin
Seedwings Europe Skyrunner XR
Seedwings Europe Skyrunner XRs
Seedwings Europe Space
Seedwings Europe Vertigo

SEEMS
(Société d'Exploitation des Etablissements Morane Saulnier, France)
see: Morane-Saulnier, SOCATA

Seguin
(Elliot Seguin)
 Seguin Wasabi Special

Seibel 
(Seibel Helicopter Co Inc, Wilson Field, Wichita, United States)
 Seibel S-1
 Seibel S-2
 Seibel S-3 Skylark
 Seibel S-4 Skyhawk
 Seibel H-24 Sky Hawk

Selcher 
(John Selcher)
 Selcher JS-1

SELA
(Société d'Etude pour la Locomotion Aérienne)
 SELA monoplane

Selex ES 
(Selex ES, Rome Italy.)
 Selex ES Falco
 Selex ES Falco EVO

Sellars 
(Dr J Sellars, White Plains, New York, United States)
 Sellars Quadroplane

Sellers 
(Matthew B Sellers Jr, Olive Hill, Kentucky, United States, Norwood, Ohio, United States, and Baltimore, Maryland, United States)
 Sellers Quadruplane a.k.a. Number 6
 Sellers Quadruplane (very little info available)

Sellet-Pelletier
(Christian Sellet & Jacques Pelletier)
 Sellet-Pelletier Grillon 120

Sellick 
(William Sellick, Cicero, Illinois, United States)
 Sellick 1913 Monoplane

Sellmer 
(Jacob P Sellmer, San Rafael, California, United States)
 Sellmer Incubator
 Sellmer 1932 helicoplane

Selvage 
(Blaine Selvage, Humboldt City, California, United States)
 Selvage 1909 Monoplane

SEMA
(Société d'Etudes de Matériels d'Aviation)
 SAB-SEMA 10 (Societé Aérienne Bordelaise – Societé d'Etudes de Materiel d'Aviation)
 SAB-SEMA 12 (Societé Aérienne Bordelaise – Societé d'Etudes de Materiel d'Aviation)

Sénaud
(Armelle Sénaud)
 Sénaud C1
 Sénaud single-engined flying boat
 Sénaud twin-engined flying boat
 Sénaud AS 10 Mistral

SEPECAT 
(Société Européenne de Production de l'avion ECAT (Ecole de Combat et d'Appui tactique), France/United Kingdom)
 SEPECAT Jaguar

Sequoia 
(Sequoia Aircraft Co, Richmond, Virginia, United States)
 Sequoia 300
 Sequoia 301
 Sequoia 302 Kodiak
 Sequoia F.8L Falco

Seremet
(W. Vincent Seremet)
 Seremet WS.1
 Seremet WS.2
 Seremet WS.3
 Seremet WS.4
 Seremet WS.4A
 Seremet WS.5
 Seremet WS.6
 Seremet WS.7
 Seremet WS.8

SERLAG 
 SERLAG 225EX

Servais
(Pierre Servais)
 Servais light aircraft
 Servais PS.10 Paul Vergnes

Servoplant
(Bucharest, Romania)
Servoplant Aerocraft

Sessions 
(Claude Sessions, Waynesville, Illinois and Owensburg, Kentucky, United States)
 Sessions 1922 Biplane
 Owensburg 1925 Biplane

Servicair 
(Servicair Co, Glendale, California, United States)
 Servicair Loadmaster

SET 
(Societatea pentru exploatari technice)
 Proto-SET 2
 SET 1
 SET 3
 SET 4
 SET 7
 SET 10
 SET X
 SET XV
 SET 31
 SET 41
 SET 61 ??

SETCA
(Société d'Études Techniques et de Constructions Aéronautiques)
 SETCA Milan
 SETCA LLP Petrel

Seux
(Edmond Seux (1869–1909))
 Aéroplane Edmond Seux

Seversky 
(Seversky Aircraft Corporation, United States)
see also Republic
 Severski 1926 Biplane
 Seversky 2PA
 Seversky AP-1
 Seversky AP-2
 Seversky AP-4
 Seversky AP-7
 Seversky AP-9
 Seversky EP-1-68  (Export Pursuit)
 Seversky EP-106  (Export Pursuit)
 Seversky NF-1
 Seversky SEV-1XP
 Seversky SEV-2XP
 Seversky SEV-3
 Seversky Navy Type S Two-Seat Fighter
 Seversky A8V
 Seversky AT-12
 Seversky BT-8
 Seversky SEV-X-BT
 Seversky FN
 Seversky P-35
 Seversky XP-41
 Seversky Super Clipper

Seville
(Seville Aircraft Inc.)
 Seville Two Place

SEVIMIA 
(Société d'Études VIctor MInié Aéronautiques)
 SEVIMIA 20

Seyedo Shohada 
 Seyedo Shohada Zafar 300

Sexton 
(Cicero, Illinois, United States)
 Sexton Monoplane

References

Further reading

External links

 List Of Aircraft (S)

de:Liste von Flugzeugtypen/N–S
fr:Liste des aéronefs (N-S)
nl:Lijst van vliegtuigtypes (N-S)
pt:Anexo:Lista de aviões (N-S)
ru:Список самолётов (N-S)
sv:Lista över flygplan/N-S
vi:Danh sách máy bay (N-S)